Calandrinia ciliata is a species of flowering plant known as fringed redmaids and red-maids. While formerly included in the purslane family, it is now treated as a member of the family Montiaceae.

It is native to western North America from British Columbia to New Mexico, where it is widespread and common. It can also be found in parts of Central and South America.

Description

The inflorescence is a raceme bearing flowers on short pedicels. There are two sepals at the base beneath the petals.

This is a hardy plant well adapted to many habitat and climate types. Where it is an introduced species, it is known as a minor weed.

References

External links
Photo gallery

ciliata
Flora of Baja California
Flora of British Columbia
Flora of California
Flora of Idaho
Flora of Nevada
Flora of New Mexico
Flora of Oregon
Flora of Washington (state)
Flora of the Cascade Range
Flora of the Great Basin
Flora of the Klamath Mountains
Flora of the Sierra Nevada (United States)
Natural history of the California chaparral and woodlands
Natural history of the California Coast Ranges
Natural history of the Central Valley (California)
Natural history of the Channel Islands of California
Natural history of the Mojave Desert
Natural history of the Peninsular Ranges
Natural history of the San Francisco Bay Area
Natural history of the Transverse Ranges